Mecyclothorax globulosus is a species of ground beetle in the subfamily Psydrinae. It was described by Georges G. Perrault in 1978.

References

globulosus
Beetles described in 1978